Jelle Faber (12 May 1924, Drogeham – 30 September 2004, Hamilton, Ontario) was a Dutch-Canadian theologian. After obtaining his Doctor of Theology degree at the Theological University of the Reformed Churches in Kampen at the age of 45, he emigrated to Canada and served as Professor of Dogmatology and Principal of the Canadian Reformed Theological Seminary from 1969 to 1989. In 1989, a Festschrift was published in his honor: Unity and Diversity: Studies Presented to Prof. Dr. Jelle Faber on the Occasion of his Retirement.

References

External links
List of publications

1924 births
2004 deaths
Canadian Calvinist and Reformed theologians
Dutch Calvinist and Reformed theologians
Dutch emigrants to Canada
People from Achtkarspelen
Presidents of Calvinist and Reformed seminaries
Systematic theologians